The tenth series of the British science fiction television programme Doctor Who premiered on 15 April 2017 and concluded on 1 July 2017 with twelve episodes, after it was formally announced in July 2015. The series is led by head writer and executive producer Steven Moffat, alongside executive producer Brian Minchin. It is the third and final series overseen by the two as executive producers, as well as Moffat's sixth and final series as head writer. This series is the tenth to air following the programme's revival in 2005 and is the thirty-sixth season overall.

Preceded by a Christmas special in December 2016, "The Return of Doctor Mysterio", the series is the third and final series starring Peter Capaldi as the Twelfth Doctor, an incarnation of the Doctor, an alien Time Lord who travels through time and space in his TARDIS, which appears to be a British police box on the outside; Capaldi announced in January 2017 that he would be stepping down from the role after the tenth series. The series introduces Pearl Mackie as Bill Potts, and also features Matt Lucas as Nardole. Michelle Gomez and John Simm return as their respective incarnations of the Master. The main story arc for the first half of the series revolves around the Doctor and Nardole occupying themselves at a university while they guard an underground vault containing Missy. Missy later travels with the team in the TARDIS, and eventually partners with her previous incarnation as they battle a Cyberman onslaught.

Steven Moffat wrote four episodes for the series. Other returning writers include Frank Cottrell-Boyce, Sarah Dollard, Jamie Mathieson, Peter Harness, Toby Whithouse, and Mark Gatiss, as well as two new writers for the revived era, Mike Bartlett and Rona Munro, the latter of whom wrote the classic-era story Survival (1989). Directors of the series included three who have previously worked on the show and three brand new ones. Filming occurred between June 2016 and April 2017. The series received positive reviews from critics. The performances of Capaldi and Mackie were met with the most praise, as well as the writing, plots, and themes of the episodes.

Episodes

The sixth, seventh and eighth episodes of the series, "Extremis", "The Pyramid at the End of the World", and "The Lie of the Land", constitute a three-part arc while remaining separate stories. The episodes "World Enough and Time" and "The Doctor Falls" serve as the series' two-part finale and only multi-part story, in the same format as the eighth series.

Supplemental episode

Casting

Peter Capaldi reprised his role as the Twelfth Doctor in his third and final series; he left after the 2017 Christmas special, while Pearl Mackie portrayed the newest companion Bill Potts, after the departure of Jenna Coleman. To avoid leaks while casting the new companion, the production team used the word "Mean Town", an anagram of "Ten Woman"; this is a reference to the fact that Bill is the companion of the tenth series, and was revealed by casting director Andy Pryor to Radio Times. Mackie made her first appearance in the first episode of the tenth series, and was the first openly gay companion. Matt Lucas returned in his role as Nardole, as seen in the 2015 and 2016 Christmas specials "The Husbands of River Song" and "The Return of Doctor Mysterio", in a regular role that started from the first episode of the series, but would not appear in every episode.

In June 2016, it was announced that Stephanie Hyam would be joining the tenth series. In July 2016, actors Mina Anwar, Ralf Little, and Kaizer Akhtar had been added to the cast and portrayed Goodthing, Steadfast, and Praiseworthy respectively in the second episode. On 16 August 2016, it was announced that David Suchet, famous for his role in Agatha Christie's Poirot, would appear as a character known as "The Landlord" in the fourth episode, "Knock Knock". Tate Pitchie-Cooper portrayed a child version of The Landlord. Fady Elsayed, who starred in the Doctor Who spin-off Class, was originally set to guest star in an episode of Doctor Who. 

In October 2016, it was announced that Justin Chatwin was set to appear as a superhero in the 2016 Christmas special "The Return of Doctor Mysterio". He was joined by Charity Wakefield, Adetomiwa Edun, Aleksandar Jovanovic, and Logan Hoffman. On 16 November 2016 the BBC announced the cast for the fifth episode, which included Kieran Bew, Peter Caulfield, Mimi Ndiweni and Katie Brayben, with Justin Salinger portraying "Tasker", while Rebecca Benson, Daniel Kerr, Juwon Adedokun, Brian Vernel, Ben Hunter, Aaron Phagura, Sam Adewunmi and Billy Matthews were announced to be appearing in the tenth episode.

On 14 October 2016, Michelle Gomez announced that she would reprise her role of Missy in the series, and in May 2017, she further stated that it would be her last series in the role. On 30 January 2017, Capaldi confirmed that the tenth series would be his last. On 6 April 2017, the BBC announced that John Simm would be returning in his role as the Master alongside Gomez. David Bradley made a cameo appearance as the First Doctor at the end of the series finale, "The Doctor Falls", which led into the 2017 Christmas special, "Twice Upon a Time".

Production

Development
In July 2015, the annual review for BBC Worldwide indicated that it had invested in a tenth series of the programme. It was announced in January 2016 that Series 10 would be Steven Moffat's final series as showrunner, after which he would be replaced in the role by Chris Chibnall in 2018. Composer Murray Gold announced in February 2018 that he would step down as the programme's composer, having served as the musical director since 2005, and that he would not be composing the music for the eleventh series, which would be instead composed by Segun Akinola.

Writing
In May 2016, Steven Moffat stated in the 500th issue of Doctor Who Magazine that he would be writing the first and last three episodes of the series. Furthermore, he stated that the series would consist mostly of single-part stories so that the new companion, Bill Potts, could have more stories to explore her character, though two-parters would still be present in the series. Moffat also wrote the 2017 Christmas special, after the tenth series had concluded.

Lawrence Gough directed the first two episodes of the tenth series, while Frank Cottrell-Boyce wrote the series' second episode, having previously written "In the Forest of the Night" for the eighth series. Sarah Dollard, who wrote "Face the Raven" for the ninth series also returned for an episode, as did playwright Mike Bartlett for an episode in the same production block as Dollard's. Matt Lucas revealed that Jamie Mathieson was set to write the fifth episode for the series, having previously written "Mummy on the Orient Express" and "Flatline" and having co-written "The Girl Who Died". Daniel Nettheim directed two episodes for the series, written by Steven Moffat and Peter Harness, after having previously directed the two-parter "The Zygon Invasion" / "The Zygon Inversion" in the ninth series.

In June 2016, Mark Gatiss stated he would be writing an episode for the series; later identified as the ninth episode, a change to Moffat's previous announcement that he would be writing for that particular episode. In 2015, Gatiss had indicated that he might write a sequel for the ninth series episode "Sleep No More"; however, this was not the basis for Gatiss' episode for the tenth series. Instead, the episode featured the return of the Ice Warriors, a race known for their appearances in the eras of the Second Doctor and Third Doctor, and in the 2013 episode "Cold War," also written by Gatiss.

Moffat announced in October 2016 that a writer who had previously written for the classic series would be returning to write an episode, later confirmed as Rona Munro, who previously wrote Survival, the final serial of both Season 26 and the classic series. Munro is the writer for the tenth episode of the series, titled "The Eaters of Light". Toby Whithouse wrote the eighth episode.

On 6 March 2017, it was announced the original Mondasian Cybermen from The Tenth Planet would be returning for the finale of the tenth series.

Music
Murray Gold composed the soundtrack to this series, the last time he did so. The orchestration was Ben Foster.

Filming
The read-through for the first production block of the tenth series took place on 14 June 2016. Filming began on 20 June 2016. The second episode was filmed in Valencia, Spain. Shooting for the first block concluded on 28 July 2016. The read-through for the second block took place on 18 July 2016, and filming began on 1 August 2016, beginning with the third episode. Production on the 2016 Christmas special began on 5 September 2016 and wrapped on 30 September 2016. The read-through for "Oxygen" took place on 12 October 2016. Shooting on the fourth block began on 17 October and ended on 18 November 2016. Filming for the fifth block began on 23 November 2016, paused in December for a break over the holidays, resumed on 3 January 2017, and concluded on 17 January 2017. The sixth block began filming concurrently on 16 January 2017, before concluding on 22 February 2017. On 6 March 2017, the BBC stated that the work on the final two episodes of the series had begun, with Rachel Talalay returning to direct her third consecutive series finale.

Filming for the series was concluded on 7 April 2017. Production for the 2017 Christmas special started on 12 June 2017 and concluded on 10 July 2017.

Filming for the spin-off series Class ran from April to September 2016, beginning before the filming for the tenth series of Doctor Who started. Peter Capaldi took part in the filming of Class and appeared in the opening episode of the spin-off series.

Production blocks were arranged as follows:

Release

Promotion
A preview scene was filmed in April 2016 as part of a promotional clip shown on 23 April 2016 on BBC One, during the semi-final half-time of the 2015–16 FA Cup. It introduced the Doctor and his new companion, Bill, being faced with Daleks. However, Moffat has stated that this scene might not be introduced into the series itself. Capaldi, Mackie, Lucas, and Moffat promoted the series at New York Comic Con in October 2016.

The first trailer for the series premiered at the end of the 2016 Christmas special, "The Return of Doctor Mysterio". A second teaser trailer was released on 25 February 2017. On 13 March 2017, the BBC released a new promotional image of Capaldi, Mackie, and Lucas, as well as releasing the title for the premiere. The full trailer for the series was premiered later the same day on BBC One, during the quarter-final half-time of the 2016–17 FA Cup, along with promotional images from the first episode.

Leading up to the launch of the series, five teaser trailers aired online. On 31 March 2017 BBC America released the trailer for Doctor Who and Class. The same day, an interview with Mackie was shown on BBC News, containing clips from the first episode. Another trailer for the series premiered on 3 April 2017. On 9 April 2017 Capaldi, Mackie, Moffat, and Minchin attended a panel at the BFI & Radio Times TV Festival, featuring a sneak preview of clips from the upcoming series.

Broadcast
In November 2015, Steven Moffat denied widespread rumours that the series was going to consist of fewer episodes, confirming that the tenth series would have a full twelve-episode order, plus the Christmas special. By Christmas 2016, the series was confirmed to have a release date set in early 2016. The tenth series premiered on 15 April 2017 in the United Kingdom, the United States, and Canada, on 16 April in Australia, and on 17 April in New Zealand. In Australia, the tenth series was accompanied by the Whovians panel show on ABC, hosted by Rove McManus.

"The Pilot" had a cinema screening in the U.S. on 17 and 19 April 2017, two and four days respectively after the episode's initial broadcast. The screening of "The Pilot" was followed by a screening of "For Tonight We Might Die", the premiere episode of the spin-off series Class, and behind-the-scenes footage of Pearl Mackie and her journey through the series. The episode was screened in Australian cinemas on 16 April 2017. The screening included a bonus feature, "Becoming The Companion".

Home media

In print

Reception

Ratings

Critical reception
Doctor Whos tenth series has received positive reviews. Series 10 holds an 88% approval rating on online review aggregate site Rotten Tomatoes with an average score of 7.54/10. The website's critical consensus reads, "Peter Capaldi's darkest wit shines in his final season as Doctor Who thanks to the newest foil and friend, Bill Potts." Writing for the Radio Times halfway through the series' run, Huw Fullerton called it "a return to form for the sci-fi series after a much-needed rest year, with the format, actors and writers all feeling fresher than during their last outing". Reaction to individual episodes were also been positive, with scores on the site ranging from 83% to 100%; four episodes of the series hold a perfect approval rating, which include the final three of the series. Specifically, episodes such as "Oxygen" and "Extremis" received positive reception, with critics saying that the former was a "great, thought-provoking episode", whilst the latter was labelled as a unique and ambitious episode, and that "Doctor Who doesn't get better than this".

The series also introduced Pearl Mackie as Bill Potts, the Doctor's newest companion; Mackie has received consistently favorable comments, noting how she was "bringing an energy distinct from any previous new series companion", describing Bill as "a wonderful change of pace", and how her acting was "consistently honest, raw at times, and never, ever whimsy", with certain scenes being "guttural" and "heart-wrenching". Controversial topics, such as racism and capitalism, were covered during episodes in the series, and were also met with positive reactions.

Awards and nominations

Soundtrack 
In April 2020, composer Murray Gold announced that the soundtrack for the tenth series was being processed, after a long delay of three years after the series had premiered.
However, as of February 2023, there has been no update.

References

Series 10
 
Series 10
2017 British television seasons